Naga United is a village located in the Chümoukedima District of Nagaland and is a suburb of Chümoukedima, the district headquarters.

Demographics
Naga United is situated in the Chümoukedima District of Nagaland. As per the Population Census 2011, there are a total 288 households in Naga United. The total population of Naga United is 1492.

See also
Chümoukedima District

References

Villages in Chümoukedima district